Nguyễn Ngọc Ngạn (born 9 March 1945 in Sơn Tây in Hanoi) is a Vietnamese-Canadian writer, essayist, and television personality.

He was born in Sơn Tây, Vietnam, but his family moved to South Vietnam when the Geneva Accords divided Vietnam in 1954. After university and service in the Army of the Republic of Vietnam, Ngạn was imprisoned by the victorious communists after the fall of Saigon in 1975 and did forced labour in a re-education camp until 1978, an experience described in his autobiography, The Will Of Heaven.

After his release, Ngạn escaped by boat to Malaysia in 1979; during the closing stages of the journey, storms hit the boat and knocked it over within sight of land. Ngạn's wife and child drowned and he was pulled unconscious from the water. He was sponsored by the Canadian government and brought to Vancouver in 1980, moving to Prince Rupert, British Columbia, and in 1985 to Toronto.

Ngạn is known for co-hosting Thuy Nga's Paris by Night with Vietnamese personality Kỳ Duyên. He co-authored Ballad Of Mulan and The Blind Man and the Cripple – Orchard Village.

References

Sources
 Nguyễn Ngọc Ngạn with E.E. Richey, The Will of Heaven: A Story of One Vietnamese and the End of His World, Dutton, 1982:

External links
 Nguyễn Ngọc Ngạn's YouTube channel
 

Vietnamese emigrants to Canada
Canadian male novelists
1945 births
Living people
Thuy Nga Productions
Canadian writers of Asian descent
Writers of Vietnamese descent
Nguyen dynasty
Masters of ceremonies
Canadian male essayists
20th-century Canadian essayists
20th-century Canadian male writers
20th-century Canadian novelists
21st-century Canadian essayists
21st-century Canadian novelists
21st-century Canadian male writers
Vietnamese Roman Catholics